The Inevitable Monsieur Dubois (French: L'Inévitable Monsieur Dubois) is a 1943 French comedy film directed by Pierre Billon and starring Annie Ducaux, André Luguet and Germaine Reuver. It was shot at the Studio François 1 in Paris. The film's sets were designed by the art director Roland Quignon. Similar in style to screwball comedy, it was produced and released during the German Occupation and was a popular success. It was subsequently remade as the 1947 Swedish film Dinner for Two.

Synopsis
Hélène Mareuil a successful businesswoman running a luxury perfume factory in Southern France. One day she accidentally knocks down the artist Claude Dubois from his bicycle. He sets out to court her, which is a far from easy task.

Cast
 Annie Ducaux as 	Hélène Mareuil
 André Luguet as Claude Dubois
 Germaine Reuver as Sophie
 Sinoël as 	Honoré
 Jean Morel as 	Le valet de chambre 
 Marcel Melrac as Le garagiste 
 Janine Viénot as 	La vendeuse 
 Mony Dalmès as 	Jacqueline Mareuil 
 Tramel as Monsieur Mouche
 Richard Francoeur as 	Verdier

References

Bibliography
 Neupert, Richard. French Film History, 1895–1946. University of Wisconsin Pres, 2022.

External links 
 

1943 films
French comedy films
1940s French-language films
1943 comedy films
Films directed by Pierre Billon
1940s French films